Plutella notabilis is a moth of the  family Plutellidae. It is found in western North America, including Washington and Yukon Territory.

References

Moths described in 1904
Plutellidae